Duncan Campbell (born 1972) is an Irish video artist, based in Glasgow. He was the winner of the 2014 Turner Prize.

Early life and education
Campbell was born in Dublin, one of the five children of Paddy and Veronica Campbell, entrepreneurs who founded a catering business, Campbell Catering, later sold to Aramark.  Paddy Campbell is a noted sculptor, having been, he said, inspired when in his 50s by his son, and three of Duncan's siblings are also active in the arts, as a film producer, a screenwriter and an actress.

Campbell grew up in Swords, north Dublin, and studied at the private secondary Sutton Park School.  He took a BA at the University of Ulster (1996) and a Masters in Fine Arts at the Glasgow School of Art (1998), remaining resident in Glasgow afterwards.

Career
In 2008, he was awarded the Bâloise Prize. In 2013, Campbell was one of the three artists chosen to represent Scotland at the Venice Biennale.

On 1 December 2014, it was announced that he had won the 2014 Turner Prize. Campbell took the prize for his video work "It for Others" – a 50-minute video work that reflects on African art and includes a dance sequence inspired by Karl Marx.

Personal life
As of 2014, Campbell, at 42, was a father of two.

References

1972 births
Artists from Dublin (city)
Alumni of Ulster University
Alumni of the Glasgow School of Art
Irish contemporary artists
Irish installation artists
Irish video artists
Bâloise Prize winners
Turner Prize winners
Living people